Qaleh Now-e Jamshid (also Romanized as Qal‘eh Now-e Jamshīd; also known as Qal‘eh Now and Qal‘eh Now-e Khāleşeh) is a village in Mazul Rural District, in the Central District of Nishapur County, Razavi Khorasan Province, Iran. At the 2006 census, its population was 1,346, in 319 families.

References 

Populated places in Nishapur County